Profundulus guatemalensis, the Guatemalan killifish, is a species of killifish from the family Profundulidae which is found in Central America in Honduras, El Salvador, Belize and Guatemala.

References

Profundulidae
Fish described in 1866
Taxa named by Albert Günther
Fish of Guatemala